Dastgerdan (also Romanized as Dastgerdān and Dastgardān; also known as Dastgardūn) is a village in Dastgerdan Rural District, Dastgerdan District, Tabas County, South Khorasan Province, Iran. At the 2006 census, its population was 249, in 66 families.

References 

Populated places in Tabas County